The Murri Rugby League Team is a representative side for Indigenous rugby league players that play in the annual Queensland Murri Rugby League Carnival.

History

Arthur Beetson Foundation Murri tour of Hawaii
Queensland Murri's faced the USA Tomahawks at Honolulu in 2012, The game was played at Kaiser Stadium with a high school gridiron game played as curtain raiser. The Murri side was selected from the Murri Carnival in Ipswich 2012 with a few of the players were Queensland Cup players likes of Brendon Marshall, Donald Malone, Ian Lacey, Keiron Lander & Kurtis Lingwoodock the side was coached by NRL star, Cory Paterson . They traveled with members of the Jaran Aboriginal and Torres Strait Islander Dance Company in a unique exchange between the three cultures in rugby league and culture.

Arthur Beetson Foundation Murri tour of New Zealand
In October 2013, a Queensland Murri representative side toured New Zealand to play A New Zealand Maori team in a two-game series. The Maori side won the first game 48–18 at Davies Park, Huntly. The second game was played at Puketawhero Park, Rotorua and was won by the Maori side, 32–16.

Queensland Murri vs New Zealand Māori 2014
The Deadly Choices Men QLD Murri Representative Team played against touring NZ Maoris on Saturday 18 October at BMD Kougari Oval

Arthur Beetson Foundation Murri Tour of Fiji
In October 2014 the Queensland Murri representative side toured Fiji. They played 2 games against the Vodafone Cup winners, Fair Trade Makoi Bulldogs and Fiji residents, the side featured third-grade club (mix between QLD Cup squad and local A-Grade) players in Queensland.

2014 squad

Major sponsors
 Arthur Beetson Foundation
 QAIHC  
 Deadly Choices

See also

 Indigenous Australians
 Murri people
 Torres Strait Islanders
 Murri Rugby League Carnival
 NSW Koori Knockout

References

Indigenous Australian sport
Rugby league teams in Queensland
Rugby league representative teams in Queensland